LivingNow is Australia's largest holistic magazine (measured by distribution and estimated readership). The magazine is a monthly independent periodical, with mainly local Australian content, and some international content. The magazine's editor-in-chief is Elizabeth Jewell, who started the magazine Whole Person (the predecessor to LivingNow) in 1989. It is estimated that Elizabeth Stephens is the longest-serving editor-in-chief in the health and wellbeing niche in Australia. The CEO of LivingNow (and all associated publications) is Emma Stephens.

LivingNow had a Circulations Audit Board (CAB) distribution of 177,652 copies between October 2006 and March 2007. This included the free version only. Living Now Media currently produces the printed magazine: LivingNow, available free at health food shops, organic stores, holistic stores, selected niche-related gift/book shops, and the online version of the magazine.

References

External links
LivingNow Magazine Website
Stress Management & Earning

1989 establishments in Australia
Lifestyle magazines published in Australia
Monthly magazines published in Australia
Women's magazines published in Australia
Free magazines
Health magazines
Magazines established in 1989